Kevin Sneddon (born April 24, 1970) is a Canadian American ice hockey coach. He is the former head coach of Vermont, a position he held from 2003 to 2020. He previously served as the head men's ice hockey coach at Union.

Playing career
The son of former professional hockey player Bob Sneddon, who played for the California Golden Seals, Kevin Sneddon was raised in Burlington, Ontario, and attended Harvard where he was a four-year letterwinner under coaches Bill Cleary and Ronn Tomassoni. He was a freshman defenseman on the Crimson's 1989 national championship team, appearing in 32 games and registering six points. After the 1989 season, Sneddon was selected in the 12th round of the 1989 NHL Draft by the Los Angeles Kings. He continued his playing career at Harvard, captaining the team his senior season, amassing 23 points in his career.

Coaching career

Union
After injuries sidelined a playing career, Sneddon began his coaching career, joining Union Bruce Delventhal's staff as an assistant in 1993. He also served as an assistant coach under Stan Moore for two seasons before assuming the role of head coach in 1998. As head coach at Union, Sneddon put together an overall record of 50-99-18, increasing the Skating Dutchmen's win record each season, capping it off at 14 wins in during the 2002-2003 season.

Vermont
On June 25, 2003 Sneddon was named the fourth head men's hockey coach in Vermont history, replacing the retiring Mike Gilligan. After a nine-win season in his first year at the helm of the Catamounts, Sneddon guided Vermont to the 2005 ECAC Hockey Tournament third-place game, losing to Colgate 2-1. The following season, Vermont became a member of Hockey East, and by 2008, the Catamounts third season in the league, UVM finished third in the conference and reached the 2008 Hockey East Tournament Championship, falling to Boston College Eagles men's ice hockey 4-0. A year later, with Hobey Baker Award finalist Viktor Stålberg, Sneddon led Vermont to a 22-12-5 record as the Catamounts made its fourth NCAA Tournament appearance, defeating Yale and Air Force in the East regional to reach the Frozen Four for the second time in school history, and first since 1996. The Catamounts were defeated by eventual national champion Boston University 5-4 in the national semifinal game.

Sneddon has since guided the Catamounts to NCAA Tournament appearances in 2010 and 2014, and also reached the Hockey East Championship semifinals in 2015. On February 5, 2020, Sneddon announced that he would retire and step down from his coaching position at Vermont after the conclusion of the 2019-20 season.

Head coaching record

References

External links
  Official Biography, Vermont Catamounts

1970 births
Living people
American ice hockey coaches
American men's ice hockey defensemen
Harvard Crimson men's ice hockey players
Ice hockey people from Ontario
Los Angeles Kings draft picks
Sportspeople from Burlington, Ontario
Union Dutchmen ice hockey coaches
Vermont Catamounts men's ice hockey coaches
NCAA men's ice hockey national champions